Anactinothrips is a genus of thrips in the family Phlaeothripidae.

Species
 Anactinothrips antennatus
 Anactinothrips brachyura
 Anactinothrips cristatus
 Anactinothrips davidi
 Anactinothrips distinguendus
 Anactinothrips fuscus
 Anactinothrips gibbifer
 Anactinothrips graphidura
 Anactinothrips gustaviae
 Anactinothrips handlirschii
 Anactinothrips longisetis
 Anactinothrips marginipennis
 Anactinothrips meinerti
 Anactinothrips nigricornis
 Anactinothrips silvicola

References

Phlaeothripidae
Thrips
Thrips genera